The Summer Triangle is an astronomical asterism in the northern celestial hemisphere. The defining vertices of this imaginary triangle are at Altair, Deneb, and Vega, each of which is the brightest star of its constellation (Aquila, Cygnus, and Lyra, respectively). The greatest declination is  +45° and lowest is +9° meaning the three can be seen from all places in the Northern Hemisphere and from the home of most of people resident in the Southern Hemisphere. The two stars in Aquila and Cygnus represent the head of an eagle and tail of a swan that looks east inscribed into the triangle and forming the altitude of the triangle. Two small constellations, Sagitta and Vulpecula, lie between Aquila in the south of the triangle and Cygnus and Lyra to the north.

History
The term was popularized by American author H. A. Rey and British astronomer Patrick Moore in the 1950s. The name can be found in constellation guidebooks as far back as 1913. The Austrian astronomer Oswald Thomas described these stars as Grosses Dreieck (Great Triangle) in the late 1920s and Sommerliches Dreieck (Summerly Triangle) in 1934.  The asterism was remarked upon by Joseph Johann von Littrow, who described it as the "conspicuous triangle" in the text of his atlas (1866), and Johann Elert Bode connected the stars in a map in a book in 1816, although without label. These are the same stars recognized in the Chinese legend of The Cowherd and the Weaver Girl, a story dating back some 2,600 years, celebrated in the Qixi Festival. The stars also bear ceremonial significance in the related celebrations of Tanabata, Chilseok, and Thất Tịch, derived from Qixi. In the mid- to late-20th century, before inertial navigation systems and other electronic and mechanical equipment took their places in military aircraft, United States Air Force navigators referred to this asterism as the "Navigator's Triangle".

Visibility

From mid-to-tropical northern latitudes:
the centre of the triangle appears about overhead around solar midnight during summer, and exactly so at about the 27th parallel north. This means it at that time rises at sunset in the east and sets at sunrise in the west. 
it is visible in the eastern sky in early mornings during spring. 
In autumn and winter evenings, it is visible in the western sky until January. 

From mid-southern latitudes, the asterism is in the north during the culmination season described above.

The stars of the Summer Triangle
Both Altair and Vega are bluish-white, rapidly-rotating A-type main sequence stars in the local neighbourhood of the sun. However, Deneb is a white supergiant star over 100 times as distant, and one of the most luminous stars in the entire galaxy.

See also
 Northern Cross
 Spring Great Diamond
 Spring Triangle
 Winter Triangle
 Winter Hexagon
 Heavenly Market enclosure

References

External links

 Summer Triangle at Basic Celestial Phenomena by Kerry Magruder
 Summer Triangle at The Astronomy Net
 Summer Triangle at DavidDarling.info
 
 

Asterisms (astronomy)
Vega